The Tsereteli family, also known as Tsertelev (Russian), is a noble family in Georgia (and partly, a Russian noble family) which gave origin to several notable writers, politicians, scholars, and artists.

History 
According to traditional accounts, the family's ancestors had been chieftains in Dagestan or Ossetia, who fled the Islamization of their homeland by Tamerlane and moved, through Circassia, into Christian Georgia in 1395. Constantine II, King of Imereti (west Georgia) from 1392 to 1401, enfeoffed them of Sachkhere and conferred the dignity of prince (tavadi) upon them. The Tsereteli held a fiefdom in Upper Imereti called Satseretlo (საწერეთლო; "of Tsereteli") with their residence at Modinakhe, and eventually turned into one of the preeminent aristocratic families in Georgia. They frequently intermarried with other Georgian noble houses and even with the branches of Bagrationi royal dynasty in both western and eastern Georgia (e.g., Prince David Tsereteli married the sister of Alexander V of Imereti in 1736, while Zurab Tsereteli married his daughter, Kethevan, to the royal prince Ioann of Georgia in 1787).

A branch of the family followed King Vakhtang VI of Kartli in his 1724 emigration to Imperial Russia, where they came to be known as Tsertelev (Церетели) and were absorbed into the Russian nobility.

Princes of Satseretlo 
c. 1380-1590 – Twelve anonymous princes
Kveli (c. 1590-1620)
Bezhan, son (c. 1620-39)
Kaikhosro, son (c. 1640-60)
Kveli, brother (c. 1660-63)
Kveli, son of Kaikhosro (c. 1663-1710)
Papuna, son (c. 1710-38)
Kaikhosro, son (1738–69)
Papuna, son (1769–90)
Kaikhosro, son (1790–1810)
1810 to Russia; henceforth, princes (knyaz) Tsereteli.

Notable members 

Akaki Tsereteli (1840–1915), a prominent Georgian poet and public figure
Gigi Tsereteli (born 1964), Politician and the President of OSCE PA
Giorgi Tsereteli (1842–1900), Georgian writer and journalist
Giorgi Tsereteli (orientalist) (1904–1973), Georgian Orientalist
Grigol Tsereteli (1878–1938), Georgian philologist
Irakli Tsereteli (1882–1959), Georgian Social-Democrat politician
Mikheil Tsereteli (1878–1965), Georgian scholar, politician, and journalist
Tamara Tsereteli (1900–1968), Georgian songstress
Vasil Tsereteli (1862–1937), Georgian politician and physician
Zurab Tsereteli (born 1934), modern Russo-Georgian painter and sculptor.  President of the Russian Academy of Arts
Zurab Semyonovich Tsereteli (1953–1992), Georgian footballer

References 

Families of Georgia (country)
Noble families of Georgia (country)
Russian nobility
Georgian-language surnames
Surnames of Georgian origin